Guo Tao (born 21 March 1987) is a Chinese baseball player. He was a member of the China national baseball team and competed in the 2006 World Baseball Classic.

Guo Tao played for the Beijing Tigers of the China Baseball League. He won the MVP award during the 2006 China Baseball League All-Star Game, hitting the only home run.

References

1987 births
2006 World Baseball Classic players
Baseball players from Beijing
Beijing Tigers players
Chinese baseball players
Living people